The Mundaneum was an institution which aimed to gather together all the world's knowledge and classify it according to a system called the Universal Decimal Classification. It was developed at the turn of the 20th century by Belgian lawyers Paul Otlet and Henri La Fontaine. The Mundaneum has been identified as a milestone in the history of data collection and management, and (somewhat more tenuously) as a precursor to the Internet.

In the 21st century, the Mundaneum is a non-profit organisation based in Mons, Belgium, that runs an exhibition space, website and archive, which celebrate the legacy of the original Mundaneum.

History
The Mundaneum was created in 1910, following an initiative begun in 1895 by Belgian lawyers Paul Otlet and Henri La Fontaine, as part of their work on documentation science. Otlet first called it the Palais Mondial ("world palace"), and it occupied the left wing of the Palais du Cinquantenaire, a government building in Brussels. Otlet and La Fontaine organized an International Conference of International Associations, which was the origin of the Union of International Associations (UIA).

Otlet regarded the project as the centrepiece of a new "world city"—a centrepiece, which eventually became an archive with more than 12 million index cards and documents. Some consider it a forerunner of the Internet (or, perhaps more appropriately, of systematic knowledge projects such as Wikipedia and WolframAlpha), and Otlet himself had dreams that one day, somehow, all the information he collected could be accessed by people from the comfort of their own homes.

An English pamphlet published in 1914 described it:

The Mundaneum was originally housed at the Palais du Cinquantenaire in Brussels (Belgium). This was originally renamed Palais Mondial, before the name Mundaneum was adopted. Otlet commissioned architect Le Corbusier to design a Mundaneum project to be built in Geneva, Switzerland in 1929. Although never built, the project triggered the Mundaneum Affair, a theoretical argument between Corbusier and Czech critic and architect Karel Teige.

In 1933, with Otlet's agreement, Otto Neurath founded the Mundaneum Institute as a branch in The Hague in 1933, which became central to his activities when he moved to the Netherlands as a refugee following the defeat of the Austrian Social Democratic Party in the Austrian Civil War. In 1936 the Mundaneum Institute launched the International Encyclopedia of Unified Science.

Later years and museum

When Nazi Germany invaded Belgium in 1940, the Mundaneum was replaced with an exhibit of Third Reich art, and some material was lost. The Mundaneum was reconstituted in a large but decrepit building in Leopold Park. It remained there until it was forced to move again in 1972.

The Mundaneum has since been relocated to a converted 1930s department store in Mons (Wallonia), where the existing museum opened in 1998.

On August 23, 2015, a Google Doodle depicting the Mundaneum filing cabinets was released. The Doodle was meant to pay tribute to the creators of the Mundaneum as pioneers of open information.

On Android phones, "The Mundaneum App offers visitors 3 unique experiences that delve into its rich and influential including 'The Origins of the Internet in Europe', the '100th Anniversary of a Nobel Peace Prize', and 'Mapping Knowledge'."

See also
 "As We May Think", an essay by Vannevar Bush
 History of libraries
 Information science
 OCLC, the world's largest library network
 Project Xanadu, the first hypertext system, founded in 1960
 WorldCat, the world's largest bibliographic database
People
 Paul Otlet (1868–1944)
 Vannevar Bush (1890–1974)
 Fred Kilgour (1914–2006)
 J.C.R. Licklider (1915–1990)
 Douglas Engelbart (1925–2013)
 Ted Nelson (1937– )
 Andries van Dam (1938– )
 Tim Berners-Lee (1955– )
Ideas
 External memory (psychology)
 Hypermedia
 Hypertext
 Intelligence amplification
 Office of the future
 Victorian Internet, term coined to describe advanced 19th-century telecommunications technologies such as the telegraph
 World Wide Web

References

Sources
 Rayward's Otlet Page: Paul Otlet and Documentation
  Mundaneum at Google Cultural Institute
 World of Learning and a Virtual Library Barry James, International Herald Tribune, June 27, 1998.
 The Web that time forgot Alex Wright, The New York Times, June 17, 2008.
 Architectures of Global Knowledge: The Mundaneum and the World Wide Web Charles van den Heuvel, Destination Library 15, 2008.
 Long Before the Internet: The Mundaneum, Cerebral Boinkfest website, January 19, 2011, retrieved from cerebralboinkfest.blogspot.ca on October 23, 2012: a weblog page outlining the Mundaneum's history.
 Dennis Pohl, „The Smart City – City of Knowledge“, in: Mondothèque: A Radiated Book / Un livre irradiant / Een irradiërend boek, Brüssel: Constant 2016, S. 235-244, .

External links

  
  
  

Archives in Belgium
Classification systems
Culture in Mons
Encyclopedism
History of computing
History of human–computer interaction
History of the Internet
Literary museums in Belgium
Multimodal interaction
Museums in Hainaut (province)
Science studies